Cloghanecarhan is a ringfort and ogham stone (CIIC 230) forming a National Monument located in County Kerry, Ireland.

Location

History

The ogham stone was erected some time in the Middle Ages; based on the grammar, it is a late inscription, c. AD 600. Next to it is a stone cashel used for later Christian burials.

Description

The ogham stone originally stood at the east entrance of the ringfort but now lies to the north. It is slate, 208 × 38 × 18 cm. The inscription reads EQQẸGGNỊ [MA]Q̣[I] ṂẠQI-CAṚATTỊNN ("'of Ec...án? son of Mac-Cáirthinn"); this is overwritten on an earlier inscription, D[ ... ]A[.C.] AVI DALAGNI [MAQI C--. The same name, in the form MAQI-CAIRATINI, appears on an ogham stone in Painestown (CIIC 40), and it means "devotee of the rowan." The first element of the townland name could mean either "ford of stepping-stones" (there is a small stream, the Direen, to the east) or to a stone beehive hut, such as is found in the cashel.

The ringfort was known locally as 'Keeldarragh'; it is circular and enclosed by a bank with entrance at east and "pillars" at the west end. Inside is a circular hut, three leachta, a souterrain and a cross slab.

References

National Monuments in County Kerry
Archaeological sites in County Kerry
Ogham inscriptions
7th-century inscriptions